The Pittsburgh & Steubenville Extension Railroad Tunnel, also known as the Panhandle Tunnel, was originally built for the Pittsburgh and Steubenville Extension Railroad in Pittsburgh. It officially opened for rail traffic in 1865.

History
The tunnel has been modified many times since it was first constructed. The southern end was again extended around 1900 to add a sidewalk to the road. This  extension lowered the height of the tunnel to the current .

Light Rail
The tunnel and the adjacent Panhandle Bridge were purchased by the Port Authority from Penn Central Corporation for $8.15 million in 1980. The tunnel is now utilized by the Pittsburgh Light Rail System for some of its right-of-way and the Steel Plaza Station.

See also
 List of tunnels documented by the Historic American Engineering Record in Pennsylvania
 Main Line (Pittsburgh to St. Louis)
 Pittsburgh, Cincinnati, Chicago and St. Louis Railroad

References

Railroad tunnels in Pennsylvania
Light rail in Pennsylvania
Port Authority of Allegheny County
Historic American Engineering Record in Pennsylvania
5 ft 2½ in gauge railways in the United States
Tunnels in Pittsburgh